Itahiwacu Bruce (born 2 March 1992), commonly known as Bruce Melodie is a Rwandan singer and songwriter and a winner of Primus Guma Guma Superstar seasons 8 (PGGSS).

He is the Founder of Igitangaza Music record Label. Bruce is also a brand ambassador of BK Arena and Primus. He does his music under 1:55 AM label which lead by Coach Gael.

History

Early years
Bruce Itahiwacu was born in Kicukiro District ,  he is the second born in a family of four by “Gervain Ntibihangana (father) and Velene Muteteri  (deceased in 2013). Bruce attended Camp Kanombe primary school in Kanombe, Rwamagana Islamic secondary school.

Musical career
Bruce is considered as a Current Rwanda Musician Leader he started singing at an early age in a church choir and released his debut song “Tubivemo” under the album called, Ndumiwe, in August 2013. His second album, Ntundize, was released in 2014 at that time, Bruce was managed under the “Super Level Music Label”. In February 2021, Bruce announced that he had signed with Cloud9 Entertainment, headed by Mr Lee Ndayisaba, to manage his music career forward.

Studio albums

He has performed throughout Rwanda and in neighboring countries, including Uganda  and has collaborated with numerous artists, including Urban Boyz, Queen Cha, Jay-C, Sheebah Karungi, Khaligraph Jones. He named Craig David as inspiration. He was the first Rwandan artist to perform at Coke Studio Africa.

Awards

Net worth 
Bruce Melodie in 2021 is preferred as one of Rwandan artists with financial stability, Bruce Melodie with his group has launched a TV Station ISIBO TV (2020)  Bruce Melodie has signed a greatest endorsement deal with  BROK Company of 50 millions Rwf, he has worked with local telecommunication companies (MTN, Airtel) through advertisement, he has signed with infinix mobility as its ambassador, he is also signed a contract with Tecno mobile in 2021 he Is also signed new contract with Kigali Arena the contract which has value of 150 millions of Rwandan francs and in 2021 he became billionaire in Rwandan Francs by signing a big Contract with Food Bundles He is topping in 20 musicians from East Africa on list of millionaires in USD.

References

External links
Biography
Bruce Melodie at Freeziki
Bruce Melody at Music In Africa
Bruce Melody at Famemix

Living people
1992 births
Rwandan male singers
People from Ruhango District